The Abaqati family (or Khandān-e-Abaqāat) is a sub-branch of the Jarwal-Kintoor branch of Nishapuri Kazmi-Musavi Sayeds who trace their lineage to the Islamic prophet Muhammad through eldest son of great-grandson of Musa al-Kadhim, he was given jagir in Jarwal-Kintoor by Sultan Muhammad Tughluq, other two were given jagir in Budgam, Kashmir and Sylhet, Bengal.

The most famous of Kintoori Sayyeds is Syed Mir Hamid Hussain Musavi Saheb-e-Abaqaat, author of a work entitled Abaqat al Anwar; the first word in the title of this work provided his descendants with the nisba (title) they still bear, Abaqati. Syed Ali Nasir Saeed Abaqati Agha Roohi, a Lucknow based cleric is from the family of Nishapuri Kintoori Sayyids and uses title Abaqati.

Sayeds of Jarwal-Kintoor
The Nishapuri Sada'at (Sayeds) of Barabanki (adjoining areas of Kintoor, Fatehpur, Jarwal and Lucknow) are Kazmi or Musavi Sayeds; that is they claim descent from the Prophet through his daughter's line and the line of the seventh Imam of the Shi'a Muslims, Musa al-Kazem. They came to India originally from Nishapur a town near Mashhad in northeastern Iran. Two brothers Sayed Sharafu'd-Din Abu Talib (who was the ancestor of Waris 'Ali) and Sayed Muhammed in thirteenth century forsaked Nishapur, Iran (via Khorasan and Mashhad) for Awadh, India in the time of Hulagu Khan (1256–1265) the Il-Khanid Mongol ruler. After their arrival in Kintoor the Saiyids were given a large jagir by Sultan Muhammad Tughluq, where they continued to hold the land in different tenures until twentieth century at the turn of which they held two-thirds of the village land of Kintoor. Sayed Alauddin Kazmi have said to be accompanied these two brothers in their movement from Iran, he later moved to Tehsil Fatehpur. The grave of Sayed Alauddin Kazmi is situated in Kintoor. The Kazmis of Fatehpur are his descendants. These Nishapuri Sayeds of Kintoor spread to adjoining localities of Barabanki e.g. Fatehpur, and even to neighbouring districts e.g. Jarwal in Bahraich district and in Lucknow. These Nishapuri Sayeds produced several outstanding Shia Muslim religious scholars in 18th, 19th and 20th centuries.

Sayeds of Kintoor can be categorized in two prominent families, namely, Abaqati (that of Sayed Hamid Hussain) and Khomeini (that of Sayed Ahmed).

Sayyids of Jarwal (Bahraich), Kintoor (Barabanki) and Zaidpur (Barabanki) were well-known Taluqadars (feudal lords) of Awadh province.

Nishapuri Sada'at of Kintoor

Many of the early Sufi saints that came to North India belonged to Sayyid families. Most of these Sayyid families came from Central Asia and Iran, but some also originate from Yemen, Oman, Iraq and Bahrain. Perhaps the most famous Sufi was Syed Salar Masud, from whom many of the Sayyid families of Awadh claim their descent. Sayyids of Jarwal (Bahraich), Kintoor (Barabanki) and Zaidpur (Barabanki) were wellknown Taluqadars (feudal lords) of Awadh province.

The Nishapuri Sada'at (Sayeds) of Barabanki (adjoining areas of Kintoor, Fatehpur, Jarwal and Lucknow) are Kazmi or Musavi Sayeds; that is they claim descent from the Prophet through his daughter's line and the line of the seventh Imam of the Shi'a Muslims, Musa al-Kazem. They came in India originally from Nishapur a town near Mashhad in northeastern Iran. Two brothers Sayed Sharafu'd-Din Abu Talib (who was the ancestor of Waris 'Ali) and Sayed Muhammed in thirteenth century forsaked Nishapur, Iran (via Khorasan and Mashhad) for Awadh, India in the time of Hulagu Khan (1256-1265) the Il-Khanid Mongol ruler. After their arrival in Kintoor the Saiyids were givena large jagir by Sultan Muhammad Tughluq, where they continued to hold the land in different tenures until twentieth century at the turn of which they held two-thirds of the village land of Kintoor. Sayed Alauddin Kazmi have said to be accompanied these two brothers in their movement from Iran, he later moved to Tehsil Fatehpur. The grave of Sayed Alauddin Kazmi is situated in Kintoor. The Kazmis of Fatehpur are his descendants. These Nishapuri Sayeds of Kintoor spread to adjoining localities of Barabanki e.g. Fatehpur, and even to neighbouring districts e.g. Jarwal in Bahraich district and in Lucknow. These Nishapuri Sayeds produced several outstanding Shia Muslim religious scholars in 18th, 19th and 20th centuries.

Zayn al-'Abidin al-Musavi who was progenitor of sayeds of Kintoor was great-great-grandfather of Sayed Ahmed. Sayeds of Kintoor can be categorized in two prominent families i.e. Abaqati (that of Sayed Hamid Hussain) and Khomeini (that of Sayed Ahmed).

Abaqati family
One branch of the Nishapuri Kintoori Sayeds took root in Lucknow. The most famous of Kintoori Sayeds is  Ayatollah Syed Mir Hamid Hussain Musavi, author of work entitled Abaqat al Anwar; the first word in the title of this work provided his descendantswith the nisba (title) they still bear, Abaqati. Syed Ali Nasir Saeed Abaqati Agha Roohi, a Lucknow based cleric is from the family of Nishapuri Kintoori Sayeds and uses title Abaqati.

Khomeini family
Towards the end of the 18th century the ancestors of the Supreme Leader of the Iranian Revolution, Ruhollah Khomeini had migrated from their original home in Nishapur, Iran to the kingdom of Oudh in northern India whose rulers were Twelver Shia Muslims of Persian origin; they settled in the town of Kintoor. Ayatollah Khomeini's paternal grandfather, Seyyed Ahmad Musavi Hindi, was born in Kintoor, he was a contemporary and relative of the famous scholar Ayatollah Syed Mir Hamid Hussain Musavi. He left Lucknow in the middle of the 19th century on pilgrimage to the tomb of Imam Ali in Najaf, Iraq and never returned. According to Moin this movement was to escape colonial rule of British Raj in India. He visited Iran in 1834 and settled down in Khomein in 1839. Although he stayed and settled in Iran, he continued to be known as Hindi, even Ruhollah Khomeini used Hindi as pen name in some of his ghazals. Also Ruhollah's brother was known by name Nureddin Hindi.

Sayyids of Jarwal
Many of the early Sufi saints that came to North India belonged to Sayyid families. Most of these Sayyid families came from Central Asia and Iran, but some also originate from Yemen, Oman, Iraq and Bahrain. Perhaps the most famous Sufi was Syed Salar Masud, from whom many of the Sayyid families of Awadh claim their descent. Sayyids of Jarwal (Bahraich), Kintoor (Barabanki) and Zaidpur (Barabanki) were well known Taluqadars (feudal lords) of Awadh province.

In Jarwal, Bahraich, the Sayyid line derived from Sayyid Zakariyya, who fled Iran during the Mongol invasion by Genghis Khan, obtaining a 15,000 bigha grant from the Delhi sovereign, Ghiyathu'd-Din. They got  settled in Jarwal after moving from Persia to Lahore to Delhi to Barabanki. In 1800 the Jarwal Sayyids, some of them Shi‘is, displaced the Ansari Shaykhs and came to hold 276 out of 365 villages in the parganah, although their holdings thereafter declined rapidly to (a still formidable) 76 villages in 1877. Khateeb-ul-Iman  Maulana Syed Muzaffar Husain Rizvi Tahir Jarwali (1932-Dec 1987) a Shia religious leader and social worker, was one of the prominent Jarwali Sayyid and celebrated preacher of late 20th century (1970s & 80s), he was also General Secretary of All India Shia Conference for some time.

Personalities
 Muhammad Quli (1775-1844), principal Sadr Amin at the British court in Meerut; author of Tathir al-mu'minin 'an najasat al-mushrikin
 Hamid Hussain Musavi (1830-1880), son of Syed Muhammad Quli author of book Abaqat ul Anwar fi Imamat al Ai'imma al-Athar
 Syed Ali Nasir Saeed Abaqati, a Lucknow based cleric; son of Syed Mohammad Saeed Saeed-ul-Millat

See also
Ijtihadi family (or Khandan-e-Ijtihad)

References

External

 
People from Barabanki, Uttar Pradesh
People from Lucknow